Flacillula is a spider genus of the jumping spider family, Salticidae, with five described species that occur in the Southeast Asian region. It is closely related to the genus Afraflacilla.

They look flattish, with a long gray body. They are often found on warm walls, rocks and tree trunks.

Species
, the World Spider Catalog accepted the following species:

 Flacillula albofrenata (Simon, 1905) – Java
 Flacillula dothalugala Bopearachchi & Benjamin, 2021 – Sri Lanka 
 Flacillula ellaensis Bopearachchi & Benjamin, 2021 – Sri Lanka
 Flacillula henryi Bopearachchi & Benjamin, 2021 – Sri Lanka
 Flacillula hodgsoni Bopearachchi & Benjamin, 2021 – Sri Lanka
 Flacillula incognita Zabka, 1985 – Vietnam
 Flacillula johnstoni Bopearachchi & Benjamin, 2021 – Sri Lanka
 Flacillula lubrica (Simon, 1901) – Sri Lanka
 Flacillula naipauli Bopearachchi & Benjamin, 2021 – Sri Lanka
 Flacillula piyasenai Bopearachchi & Benjamin, 2021 – Sri Lanka
 Flacillula purpurea (Dyal, 1935) – Pakistan

References

 Salticidae.org: Genus Flacillula

Salticidae
Taxa named by Embrik Strand
Spiders of Asia
Salticidae genera